Wolfgang is a 2021 American documentary film, directed and produced by David Gelb. It follows the life and career of chef Wolfgang Puck.

It had its world premiere at the Tribeca Film Festival on June 12, 2021. It was released on June 25, 2021, by Disney+.

Synopsis
The movie follows the life and career of chef Wolfgang Puck.

Production
In October 2019, it was announced David Gelb would direct and produce a documentary revolving around the life of chef Wolfgang Puck, with Disney+ set to distribute.

Release
The film had its world premiere at the Tribeca Film Festival on June 12, 2021. It was released on June 25, 2021.

Reception

Critical response 
On Rotten Tomatoes, the documentary holds an approval rating of 86% based on 21 reviews, with an average rating of 7.1/10.

Jason Bailey of The New York Times found the film very interesting for depicting Wolfgang Puck's rise to fame and his impact on culinary arts, praised David Gelb's direction, claiming it gives an agreeable photography of the meals depicted across the documentary film, but declared that the movie focuses too much on Wolfgang's achievements and not enough on his personal life. John Serba of Decider found that the documentary manages to provide a genuine portrait of Wolfgang's life across his achievements and his regrets, claiming it gives a human touch on the businessman. Jennifer Green of Common Sense Media rated the film 3 out of 5 stars, complimented the educational value of the movie, stating it manages to depict some of the challenges encountered when being a chef and running a restaurant, and praised the positive messages and role models, claiming the film promotes self-assurance, integrity, and honesty. Odie Henderson of RogerEbert.com rated the film 2,5 out of 4 stars and praised Will Basanta's cinematography, stating it manages to provide a satisfying aesthetic through his shots, while claiming the film successfully depicts Wolfgang as a famous chef and self-made man, but found that the documentary film focuses too much on business and not enough on Wolfgang's personal life.

References

External links
 

2021 films
2021 documentary films
American documentary films
Biographical documentary films
Documentary films about food and drink
Disney+ original films
Disney documentary films
2020s English-language films
2020s American films